Per Leegaard (born 15 July 1982) is a Danish team handball player. He currently plays for the Danish club Viborg HK.

He has made several appearances for the Danish national handball team, winning bronze medals at the 2006 European Men's Handball Championship and the 2007 World Men's Handball Championship.

External links
EM-truppen, Schweiz 2006 at Danish Handball Federation
Portrætfotos af Herre-A VM-truppen 2007 at Danish Handball Federation

1982 births
Living people
Danish male handball players
Viborg HK players
People from Thisted
Sportspeople from the North Jutland Region